Parliamentary elections were held in South Ossetia on 31 May 2009. The result was a victory for the ruling Unity Party, which won seventeen of the 34 seats. Two opposition parties were not permitted to run out of concern that they might not be loyal to President Eduard Kokoity.

Under laws of Georgia, the elections were illegal.

The European Union, the United States, and NATO have issued statements saying these organisations consider the elections illegal, and have rejected their results.

Background
The Republic of South Ossetia has a population of about 70,000. It has had de facto independence from central Georgian rule since the 1991–1992 South Ossetia War. After the August 2008 South Ossetia war, Russia recognized the independence of South Ossetia, followed by Nicaragua. Other countries, including Georgia, consider South Ossetia part of Georgia's constitutional territory.

Campaign

Four parties were contesting for 34 seats in the Parliament of South Ossetia. According to the central election commission, 45,000 people were registered to vote on Sunday. This was the first South Ossetian election since the republic obtained its limited international recognition in 2008. The election was observed by over 70 observers from 10 countries, including representatives from Abkhazia, the Czech Republic, Germany, Italy, Kazakhstan, Kyrgyzstan, Moldova, Nagorno-Karabakh, Ukraine, Poland, and Russia. Among the observers were Vladimir Churov, the chairman of the Central Election Commission of Russia and Giulietto Chiesa, Italian MEP for Italy of Values, former member of the Italian Communist Party.

About 100 Russian and international reporters arrived in South Ossetia to cover the event. Voters were able to cast ballots at 95 polling stations, 88 in South Ossetia and 7 in Russia (6 of them opened in North Ossetia and 1 in Moscow).  No other overseas polling stations were open.

Structure
The election was conducted using the party-list proportional representation system with a 7% election threshold.  For South Ossetian authorities to consider the election valid, the voter turnout would have been at least 50% + 1 vote, and at least two parties would have acquired securing seats in the parliament.  If these criteria hadn't been fulfilled, the South Ossetian legislation provided for a repeat election in four months.

Parties
The following parties participated in the election:
Unity Party
Communist Party of South Ossetia
People's Party of South Ossetia
Fatherland Socialist Party

The Unity Party is the ruling party in the current parliament. According to Reuters, Unity, Communists, and the People's party support the current President Eduard Kokoity, while the Fatherland Socialist Party opposes him.  Two opposition parties were barred from running.

Opinion polls

Results
As of 10:00 UTC, 59.88% of registered voters had cast their votes, crossing the electoral threshold of 50% plus one vote. The South Ossetian election commission has thus declared the elections valid.

According to the preliminary results, the Unity Party has obtained the most votes with 46.38% of the vote, followed by People's Party with 22.58% and the Communists with 22.25%, thus securing 17, 9 and 8 parliament seats respectively, while the Fatherland Socialist Party fell just short of passing the 7% threshold with only 6.37%. The official results were expected by June 7.

According to the final results, the Unity Party won 17 seats with 21,246 votes, the People's Party won nine seats with 10,345 votes and the Communist Party won eight seats with 10,194 votes.

Reaction
International observers Group of 11 observers, representing Italy, Germany, Poland, and Russia noted the election was held 'complying with common democratic standards. Italian MEP Giulietto Chiesa commented: 

 The EU refused to accept either the legality of the election or its results.
NATO The Secretary-General of NATO, Jaap de Hoop Scheffer said the alliance did not recognize the elections and reiterated "its full support for the sovereignty and territorial integrity of Georgia within its internationally recognized borders".
 Georgia dismissed the election as illegitimate. Temur Iakobashvili, the State Minister for Reintegration commented: 
 The United States denounced the elections "as a step away from a peaceful and negotiated solution to the conflict" and refused to "recognize neither the legality nor the results."

 Andrei Nesterenko, spokesman for the Russian Ministry of Foreign Affairs, said that the election was judged by international observers to be free and compliant with international norms, and that the election is important for the further development and democratisation of South Ossetia. On comments offered by the European Union and the United States, Nesterenko stated:

References

Elections in South Ossetia
South Ossetia
2009 in Georgia (country)
2009 in South Ossetia